Keep Smiling is a 1925 American silent comedy film directed by Albert Austin and Gilbert Pratt. It stars Monty Banks (real name Mario Bianchi) and Glen Cavender.

The story features a boy with a fear of water who invents a life preserver that inflates when it comes in contact with water. Promoting his invention, he becomes involved with a wild speedboat race, a crooked mechanic, and the darling daughter of a boating magnate.

Plot
As described in a film magazine reviews, the Boy (Monty  Banks), a yokel of the fishing village, has  grown up in fear of the water because his father had been lost at sea. He has invented a lifesaving device which he wishes to submit to James P. Ryan, a wealthy shipping magnate. He has a letter of introduction to Ryan which gets mixed up with a letter introducing Bordanni, a famed motor boat racer who is to handle Ryan’s entry in the race classic the following day. The Boy is rushed into a party in full swing (after being supplied with clothes which all fit except for the  shoes). Ryan’s daughter Rose (Anne Cornwall), whose life he has once saved, is overjoyed to find that her one-time rescuer is the famous Bordanni and expresses the hope that he will win the race. Of course, in spite of all setbacks, lack of knowledge, and adverse circumstances, he wins a most breath-taking and riotous race — houses, boats, bridges, docks, etc., were just like thin air to him. His boat is demolished, but he is saved because of his lifesaving device.

Cast

Preservation
A print of Keep Smiling was preserved in the Russian archive Gosfilmofond and presented to the Library of Congress in 2010.

References

External links

1925 films
Silent American comedy films
1925 comedy films
1920s English-language films
American silent feature films
Films directed by Gilbert Pratt
Surviving American silent films
Associated Exhibitors films
Films directed by Albert Austin
1920s American films